Sen'Derrick Dewayne Marks (born February 23, 1987) is a former American football defensive tackle. He played college football at Auburn, and drafted by the Tennessee Titans in the second round of the 2009 NFL Draft.

Early years
Marks attended Vigor High School in Prichard, Alabama. He played high school football for the Wolves.

College career
Marks played for Auburn under head coach Tommy Tuberville from 2005 to 2008.

On September 22, 2007, Marks recorded an interception against New Mexico State.

On December 30, 2008, Marks announced he would forgo his senior season at Auburn and enter the 2009 NFL Draft.

Marks finished his collegiate career with 115 total tackles, 7.5 sacks, one interception, four passes defensed, and one forced fumble.

 Coaches Freshman All-SEC Team (2006)
 The Sporting News Freshman All-America Third Team (2006)
 Rivals.com First-Team Freshman All-American (2006)
 The Sporting News SEC All-Freshman Team (2006)
 Mark Dorminey Defensive MVP Award (2008)

Professional career

Tennessee Titans
Marks was drafted by the Tennessee Titans in the second round with the 62nd overall pick of the 2009 NFL Draft.

2009 season
Marks made his NFL debut in Week 4 of the 2009 season against the Jacksonville Jaguars and recorded a solo tackle in the 37–17 loss. In the 2009 regular season finale against the Seattle Seahawks, Marks recorded his first career sack against Matt Hasselbeck.

2010 season
In Week 3, against the New York Giants, Marks recorded his first professional interception off of Eli Manning. He made his first start against the Philadelphia Eagles in Week 7.

2011 season
For the first time in his professional career, Marks appeared in all 16 games and made nine starts.

2012 season
Marks appeared in and started 14 games for the Titans in the 2012 season. He recorded 1.5 sacks, 41 total tackles, six quarterback hits, three passes defensed, and one forced fumble.

Jacksonville Jaguars
Marks was signed by the Jacksonville Jaguars on April 2, 2013.

2013 season
Marks had his productive season as a professional in his first season with Jaguars. He started all 16 games and recorded four sacks, 34 total tackles, six tackles-for-loss, ten quarterback hits, eight passes defensed, and two forced fumbles.

2014 season
Marks continued his productive stint with the Jaguars in the 2014 season. He started all 16 games and recorded 8.5 sacks, 44 total tackles, 15 tackles-for-loss, 17 quarterback hits, and three passes defensed. Marks tore his ACL in the regular season finale against the Houston Texans. After the 2014 season, Marks was ranked 76th on the NFL Top 100 Players of 2015 by his fellow players.

2015 season
Marks only played in four games in the 2015 season due to knee and triceps injuries. The triceps injury occurred in Week 10 against the Baltimore Ravens.

2016 season
Marks returned from his injury and played in all 16 games in the 2016 season. He recorded 3.5 sacks, 22 total tackles, seven tackles-for-loss, nine quarterback hits, and one pass defensed.

On March 9, 2017, Marks was released by the Jaguars.

San Francisco 49ers
On August 23, 2017, Marks signed with the San Francisco 49ers. He was released on September 2, 2017.

References

External links
 
Auburn Tigers bio

1987 births
Living people
Players of American football from Alabama
Sportspeople from Mobile, Alabama
American football defensive tackles
Vigor High School alumni
Auburn Tigers football players
Tennessee Titans players
Jacksonville Jaguars players
San Francisco 49ers players
Ed Block Courage Award recipients